Ambrysus mormon, the creeping water bug, is a species of creeping water bug in the family Naucoridae. It is found in Central America and North America.

Subspecies
These three subspecies belong to the species Ambrysus mormon:
 Ambrysus mormon heidemanni Montandon, 1910
 Ambrysus mormon minor La Rivers, 1963
 Ambrysus mormon mormon Montandon, 1909

References

Further reading

 

Articles created by Qbugbot
Insects described in 1909
Naucoridae